Photoreceptor phosphodiesterase 6 (PDE6 or PDE-6) is a protein complex family, which is highly concentrated in the retina.

See also 
 cGMP
 PDE6A
 PDE6B
 PDE6C
 PDE6D
 PDE6G

References 

EC 3.1.4